Tarache bella is a species of bird-dropping moth in the family Noctuidae first described by William Barnes and Foster Hendrickson Benjamin in 1922. It is found in North America.

The MONA or Hodges number for Tarache bella is 9147.

References

Further reading

 
 
 

Acontiinae
Articles created by Qbugbot
Moths described in 1922